Aphanobasidium is a genus of corticioid or crust fungi in the Radulomycetaceae family. The genus has a widespread distribution and contains several species. This genus was formally considered to be part of the Pterulaceae family.

A major reclassification of the Pterulaceae family occurred in 2020 and the genera Aphanobasidium, Radulomyces and Radulotubus were moved to a new family, Radulomycetaceae by the mycologists Caio A. Leal-Dutra, Bryn Tjader Mason Dentinger and Gareth W. Griffith.

Species 
, Species Fungorum accepted 18 species of Aphanobasidium.

 Aphanobasidium acanthophoenicis
 Aphanobasidium albidum
 Aphanobasidium alpestre
 Aphanobasidium aurobisporum
 Aphanobasidium aurora
 Aphanobasidium biapiculatum
 Aphanobasidium bicorne
 Aphanobasidium bisterigmaticum
 Aphanobasidium bourdotii
 Aphanobasidium curvisporum
 Aphanobasidium filicinum
 Aphanobasidium gloeocystidiatum
 Aphanobasidium paludicola
 Aphanobasidium pseudotsugae
 Aphanobasidium rubi
 Aphanobasidium sphaerosporum
 Aphanobasidium subcalceum
 Aphanobasidium subnitens

References

External links

Pterulaceae
Agaricales genera
Taxa named by Walter Jülich